The Lithuanian partisans were partisans who waged a guerrilla warfare in Lithuania against the Soviet Union in 1944–1953. Similar anti-Soviet resistance groups, also known as Forest Brothers and cursed soldiers, fought against Soviet rule in Estonia, Latvia and Poland. It is estimated that a total of 30,000 Lithuanian partisans and their supporters were killed. The Lithuanian partisan war lasted almost for a decade, thus being one of the longest partisan wars in Europe.

At the end of World War II, the Red Army pushed the Eastern Front towards Lithuania. The Soviets invaded and occupied Lithuania by the end of 1944. As forced conscription into Red Army and Stalinist repressions intensified, thousands of Lithuanians used forests in the countryside as a natural refuge. These spontaneous groups became more organized and centralized culminating in the establishment of the Union of Lithuanian Freedom Fighters in February 1948. In their documents, the partisans emphasized that their ultimate goal is recreation of independent Lithuania. As the partisan war continued, it became clear that the West would not interfere in Eastern Europe (see Western betrayal) and that the partisans had no chance of success against the far stronger opponent. Eventually, the partisans made an explicit and conscious decision not to accept any new members. The leadership of the partisans was destroyed in 1953 thus effectively ending the partisan war, though individual fighters held out until the 1960s.

Background
Lithuania had regained its independence in 1918 after the collapse of the Russian Empire. As pre-war tensions rose in Europe, Nazi Germany and the Soviet Union signed the Molotov–Ribbentrop Pact and divided Eastern Europe into spheres of influence. Subsequently, Lithuania was occupied by the Soviet Union in June 1940. The Soviets instituted Sovietization policies and repressions. In June 1941, the Soviets deported over 17,000 Lithuanians to Siberia, with most of the deportees dying during the harsh winters. When a few days later Germany launched an invasion of Russia, Lithuanians organized a popular anti-Soviet uprising. Initially, the Lithuanians greeted the Germans as liberators from the repressive Soviet rule and made plans to reestablish independent Lithuania. However, the attitudes soon changed as the occupation of Lithuania by Nazi Germany continued.

Unlike Estonia and Latvia where the Germans conscripted the local population into military formations within Waffen-SS, Lithuania boycotted German recruitment calls and never had its own Waffen-SS division. In 1944, the Nazi authorities authorized the Lithuanian Territorial Defense Force (LTDF) under General Povilas Plechavičius to combat Soviet partisans led by Antanas Sniečkus and the Polish partisans of the Home Army. The LTDF soon reached the strength of 19,500 men. The Germans, however, quickly came to see this force as a nationalist threat to their occupation regime. The senior staff were arrested on May 15, 1944, and General Plechavičius was deported to the Salaspils concentration camp in Latvia. However, a large proportion of the LTDF succeeded in escaping deportation to Germany and formed guerrilla units and dissolved into the countryside in preparation for partisan operations against the Soviet Army as the Eastern Front approached.

On July 1, 1944, the Lithuanian Freedom Army (LLA) declared the state of war against the Soviet Union and ordered all its able members to mobilize into platoons, stationed in forests and to not leave Lithuania. The departments were replaced by two sectors – operational, called Vanagai (Hawks or Falcons; abbreviated VS), and organizational (abbreviated OS). Vanagai, commanded by Albinas Karalius (codename Varenis), were the armed fighters while the organizational sector was tasked with passive resistance, including supply of food, information, and transport to Vanagai. In the middle of 1944, the Lithuanian Freedom Army had 10 000 members.  The Soviets killed 659 and arrested 753 members of the Lithuanian Freedom Army by January 26, 1945. Founder Kazys Veverskis was killed in December 1944, the headquarters were liquidated in December 1945. This represented the failure of highly centralized resistance, as the organization was too dependent on Veverskis and other top commanders. In 1946 remaining leaders and fighters of the LLA started to merge with Lithuanian partisans. In 1949 all members of the presidium of the Union of Lithuanian Freedom Fighters – captain Jonas Žemaitis-Tylius, Petras Bartkus-Žadgaila, and Bronius Liesys-Naktis ir Juozas Šibaila-Merainis – came from LLA.

The Supreme Committee for the Liberation of Lithuania (VLIK) was created on November 25, 1943. VLIK published underground newspapers and agitated for resistance against the Nazis. The Gestapo arrested most influential members in 1944. After the reoccupation of Lithuania by the Soviets, VLIK moved to the West and set as its goal to maintain the non-recognition of Lithuania's occupation and dissemination of information from behind the Iron Curtain – including the information provided by the Lithuanian partisans.

Former members of the Lithuanian Territorial Defense Force, Lithuanian Freedom Army, Lithuanian Armed Forces, Lithuanian Riflemen's Union formed the basis of Lithuanian partisans. Farmers, Lithuanian officials, students, teachers, even pupils joined the partisan movement. The movement was actively supported by the society and the Catholic church. It is estimated that by the end of 1945, 30 000 armed people stayed in forests in Lithuania.

Organization

The resistance in Lithuania was well organized, and the uniformed with chain of command guerrilla units were effectively able to control whole regions of the countryside until 1949. Their armaments included Czech Škoda guns, Russian Maxim heavy machine guns, assorted mortars and a wide variety of mainly German and Soviet light machine guns and submachine guns. When not in direct battles with the Soviet Army or special NKVD units, they significantly delayed the consolidation of Soviet rule through ambush, sabotage, assassination of local Communist activists and officials, freeing imprisoned guerillas, and printing underground newspapers. Captured Lithuanian Forest Brothers themselves often faced torture and summary execution while their relatives faced deportation to Siberia (cf. quotation). Reprisals against pro-Soviet farms and villages were harsh. The NKVD units, Destruction battalions (known by the Lithuanians as pl. stribai, from the  – destroyers) used cruel repression to discourage further resistance, e.g. displaying executed partisans' corpses in village courtyards.

The partisans were well-armed. During the 1945–1951 Soviet repressive structures seized from partisans 31 mortars, 2,921 machine guns, 6,304 assault rifles, 22,962 rifles, 8,155 pistols, 15,264 grenades, 2,596 mines, and 3,779,133 cartridges. The partisans usually replenished their arsenal by killing istrebiteli, members of Soviet secret-police forces or by purchasing ammunition from Red Army soldiers. Every partisan had binoculars and few grenades. One grenade was usually saved to blow themselves and their faces to avoid being taken as prisoner, since the physical tortures of Soviet MGB/NKVD were very brutal and cruel, and be recognised, to prevent their relatives from suffering.

Armed resistance

Rise: summer 1944 – summer 1946 
In the first year of the partisan warfare, during World War II, about 10,000 Lithuanians were killed – about half of the total deaths. Men avoided conscription to the Red Army and hid in the forests, spontaneously joining the Lithuanian partisans. Not all groups were armed or intended to actively fight the Soviets. Partisan groups were relatively large, 100 men and more. There were several larger open engagements between the partisans and NKVD, like in Kalniškė, Paliepiai, Seda, Virtukai, Kiauneliškis, Ažagai-Eimuliškis and the battle at the village of Panara. Since the Soviets had not established their control, the partisans controlled entire villages and towns.

In July 1945, after the end of World War II, the Soviets announced "amnesty" and "legalization" campaign for those hiding in the forests to avoid conscription. According to a Soviet report from 1957, in total 38,838 people came forward under the campaign (8,350 of them were classified as "armed nationalist bandits" and 30,488 as deserters avoiding conscription).

Maturity: summer 1946–1948 
In the second stage of partisan warfare, the partisan groups became smaller but better organized. They organized themselves into units and military districts and sought better centralization. The territory of Lithuania was divided into three regions and nine military districts:
 Southern Lithuanian or Nemunas: Tauras and Dainava districts,
 North – Eastern Lithuanian or Kalnų (Mountains): Algimantas, Didžioji Kova, Vytis and Vytautas districts,
 Western Lithuanian or Jūros (Sea): Kęstutis, Prisikėlimas and Žemaičiai districts.

Open engagements with NKVD/MGB were replaced by more clandestine activities. It was important to keep people's spirits. Therefore, the partisans hid in bunkers and engaged in more political and propaganda activities. In particular they protested and disrupted elections to the Supreme Soviet of the Soviet Union in February 1946 and to the Supreme Soviet of the Lithuanian SSR in February 1947. They published various bulletins, leaflets, newspapers. In total, there were almost 80 different periodicals published by the partisans. MGB also changed its tactics. It began to recruit agents and organize destruction battalions. The partisans responded by organizing reprisal actions against the collaborators with the Soviets.

To combat the guerilla,  in May 1948 the Soviets carried out the largest deportation from Lithuania, Operation Spring, when some 40 to 50 thousand people associated with "forest brothers" were deported to Siberia.

Decline: 1949–1953 
In February 1949, partisan leaders met in the village of Minaičiai and established the centralized command, the Union of Lithuanian Freedom Fighters. Brigadier General Jonas Žemaitis was elected as its chairman. On February 16, 1949, the 31st anniversary of the Act of Independence of Lithuania, the Joint Staff of the Union of Lithuanian Freedom Fighters signed a declaration on the future of Lithuania. The declaration stated that reinstated Lithuania should be a democratic state, that would grant equal rights for every citizen, based on freedom and democratic values. It did declare that Communist party is a criminal organization. The document of the declaration has survived and was preserved by the KGB. In 1999, the Lithuanian Seimas (parliament) formally recognized this declaration as Declaration of Independence.

Juozas Lukša was among those who managed to escape to Western countries; he wrote his memoirs – Forest Brothers: The Account of an Anti-Soviet Lithuanian Freedom Fighter, 1944–1948 – while in Paris and was killed after returning to occupied Lithuania in 1951. By the early 1950s, the Soviet forces had eradicated most of the Lithuanian nationalist resistance. Intelligence gathered by the Soviet spies in the West and KGB infiltrators within the resistance movement, in combination with large-scale Soviet operations in 1952 managed to end the campaigns against them.

Adolfas Ramanauskas (code name Vanagas), the last official commander of the Union of Lithuanian Freedom Fighters, was arrested in October 1956 and executed in November 1957. The last Lithuanian anti-Soviet resistance fighters killed in action were Pranas Končius (code name Adomas) and Kostas Liuberskis (code name Žvainys). Končius was killed on July 6, 1965 (some sources indicate he shot himself on July 13 in order to avoid capture) and awarded the Cross of Vytis in 2000. Liuberskis was killed on October 2, 1969; his fate was unknown until the late 2000s. Stasys Guiga (code name Tarzanas) died in hiding in 1986.

Structure

Aftermath, memorials and remembrances

Many nationalist partisans persisted in the hope that Cold War hostilities between the West, which never formally recognized the Soviet occupation, and the Soviet Union might escalate to an armed conflict in which Lithuania would be liberated. This never materialized, many of the surviving former partisans remained bitter that the West did not take on the Soviets militarily.

As the conflict was relatively undocumented by the Soviet Union (the Lithuanian fighters were never formally acknowledged as anything but "bandits and illegals"), some consider it and the Soviet-Lithuanian conflict as a whole to be an unknown or forgotten war. Discussion of resistance was suppressed under the Soviet regime. Writings on the subject by the Lithuanian emigrants were often labelled by Soviet propaganda as examples of "ethnic sympathy" and disregarded.

In Lithuania, freedom fighter veterans receive a state pension. The third Sunday in May is commemorated as Partisan's Day. As of 2005, there were about 350 surviving partisans in Lithuania.

Žaliukas ("Green man") is the Lithuanian partisans inspired qualification patch in the Lithuanian Special Operations Forces given for the very best. Žaliukas is the word for the state of alert of the unyielding part of the nation in the face of danger.

Legal assessment

Lithuanian courts view the Soviet repressions against the Lithuanian partisans as crimes against humanity. In 2016, the Supreme Court of Lithuania ruled that the systematic extermination of the partisans by the Soviet regime constituted a genocide. In 2019, the European Court of Human Rights upheld the view of the national courts that these Soviet repressions can be deemed as a genocide.

Dramatizations
The 1966 film Nobody Wanted to Die by Soviet-Lithuanian film director Vytautas Žalakevičius shows the tragedy of the conflict in which "a brother goes against the brother". Despite being shot from a Soviet perspective and propaganda, the film gives some hints that allude to the possibility of alternative points of view. The film brought acclaim to Žalakevičius, and to a number of young Lithuanian actors starring in the film.

The 2004 film Utterly Alone portrays the travails of Lithuanian partisan leader Juozas Lukša who traveled twice to Western Europe in attempts to gain support for the armed resistance.

The 2005 documentary film Stirna tells the story of Izabelė Vilimaitė (codenames Stirna and Sparnuota), an American-born Lithuanian who moved to Lithuania with her family in 1932. A medical student and pharmacist, she was an underground medic and source of medical supplies for the partisans, eventually becoming a district liaison. She infiltrated the local Komsomol (Communist Youth), was discovered, captured, and escaped twice. After going underground full-time, she was suspected of having been turned by the KGB as an informant and was nearly executed by the partisans. Her bunker was eventually discovered by the KGB and she was captured a third time, interrogated and killed.

In 2008, an American documentary film, Red Terror on the Amber Coast was released, documenting the Lithuanian resistance to the Soviet occupation from the signing of the Molotov–Ribbentrop Pact in 1939 to the dissolution of the Soviet Union in 1991.

In 2014, The Invisible Front, a documentary focusing on Juozas Lukša, was released in the US.

In 2021, Icelandic composer and producer Ólafur Arnalds released a track Partisans, thus honoring the Lithuanian partisans resistance.

See also
Anti-Soviet partisans
Guerrilla war in the Baltic states
Estonian partisans
Latvian partisans
Territorial Unit (Lithuania)

Notes and references

Further reading

Razgaitis, Darius. Forest Brothers from the West, research thesis, 2002.

External links 
 Genocide and Resistance Research Centre of Lithuania
 Activities of Lithuanian Partisans in the West, p. 16
 Lithuanian Tauras District Partisans and Deportation Museum
 Soviet Terror In Lithuania During The Post-War Years
 War Chronicle of the Partisans – Chronicle of Lithuanian partisans, June 1944 – May 1949, prepared by Algis Rupainis
 Historynet – Lithuania vs U.S.S.R.: A secret hot fight in the Cold War

 
Eastern European World War II resistance movements
Lithuanian Soviet Socialist Republic
Military history of the Soviet Union
Cold War military history of the Soviet Union
Guerrilla organizations
Cold War rebellions